Mort & Phil is a Spanish comic series, published in more than a dozen languages. It appeared for the first time in 1958 in the children's comic-book magazine  drawn by Francisco Ibáñez. The series features Mort, the tall, bald master of disguise named after mortadella sausage, and his bossy partner, the shorter, pudgier Phil Pi.

The series frequently uses slapstick humour whereby the characters constantly suffer mishaps - such as falls from heights, explosions, and being crushed by heavy objects. Thanks to  cartoon physics, the effects rarely last more than one panel.

Overview
Mort and Phil are a pair of idiots, and no matter what kind of mission they are assigned they always manage to get it wrong. The results are almost invariably extremely violent, and most often directed towards Phil.

Outside Spain, the series is especially popular in Germany as Clever & Smart. After the 1980s, the albums have featured current news, like computer sabotage, the AVE, Islamic terrorism, Spanish and European politics, and specials for the Olympic Games and the football World Cup.

Ibáñez likes to introduce whimsies unrelated to the action, especially in front covers. Examples have included a water tap sprouting from a tree, two mice chatting, and a vase containing a foot or an eggplant. In the final page of the album  (1993), featured a New York scene  with an aeroplane crashing into the World Trade Center. This attracted attention after the 9/11 attacks of 2001.

Ibáñez issues several albums a year. One animated series and some animated films were also produced. There are two live-action movies based on the series, one of them made in 2003 in Spain titled  (Mort & Phil: The Big Adventure). A second movie was released in 2008,  (Mort & Phil. Mission: Save Earth), marking the 50th anniversary of the series.

Characters

Mort (Mortadelo) 
Mort is a bald detective with pebble glasses and a long nose who usually wears a black frock coat. He is always fighting with Phil, his partner, mostly because he tends to mess things up, usually to Phil's discomfort: his profound lack of skills to make his disguises believable and common sense have often made him a danger to everyone around him. His favourite hobby is wearing all sorts of (sometimes outrageous) disguises - professional and historical clothes and gear, animals, inanimate objects, even small-sized vehicles like miniature blimps and mopeds - which he mostly dons for special tasks or when he is on the run from Phil or his boss, and which all include his signature collar which obscures part of his mouth. He holds a grudge against Bacterio because he used to have lush hair until Bacterio offered him a supposed medicine against baldness, which actually made his hair fall out.

Phil Pi/
Mort's partner and friend. He only has two hairs on his head and wears a white shirt with a black bowtie and red trousers. He usually insults Mort because Mort is quite clumsy, but is often at the receiving end of any mishaps which come their way, mostly in the shape of their outraged boss.

As the leader of the two-man team, Phil is an educated man and an expert in a variety of fields. In the movies, however, Filemón is shown to be just as ditzy as Mortadelo (especially in the animated movie Mortadelo and Filemon: Mission Implausible).

Vicente / 
Called for short  or just , Vicente is Mort and Phil's boss. While he, as the head of the organisation, lives in splendour, indulging himself in expensive beverages and Cuban cigars, he keeps the T.I.A.'s operatives on an extremely tight budget. Vicente is bald and has a dense moustache, which makes him the object of mocking abuse by his underlings as a human walrus. He is very short-tempered and usually gets angry with Mort and Phil because they fail in their missions, making a mess of everything - occasionally at the expense of his own possessions. Just as often, however, he ends up as the one being chased by his underlings, as his frequently short-sighted assignments, and his habitual failure to properly introduce them, cause them no end of grief.

Professor Bacterio
The T.I.A.'s black-bearded scientist and chief inventor. Mort blames him for his baldness (he had tried a new hair-strengthening concoction on Mort's then-lush mane, which made the hair fall out instead) and therefore the doctor is the unwilling prime recipient of Mort's practical jokes. His inventions, which are intended to assist Mort and Phil in their assignments, often fail quite spectacularly, mostly because they either achieve the opposite of what they are supposed to do, or work perfectly but fail at the most inconvenient moment. His name comes from bacteria.

Ofelia
The fat and vain secretary of Superintendente Vicente. She is still single and would like to become involved with someone (usually with Mort), but so far her attempts have been in vain. She is quite touchy about her lack of luck with a relationship and being called fat; she reacts with corresponding violence when either of topics are brought up; and with her considerable weight, this is nothing to be ignored. She was the first female character created for the series.

Irma 
The bombshell secretary of El Súper. Both Mort and Phil have a huge crush on her (much to Ofelia's chagrin), but she is not interested. This character disappeared from the series after only 24 volumes.

F. Ibañez
The creator of the series himself has a number of cameo appearances, either by name or in cartoon form. Mostly he is portrayed as the bald and bespectacled "Artist of the Nation", in perhaps the same league as Pablo Picasso. On several occasions, the series' characters often long to be "as rich as Ibáñez".

Rompetechos
Rompetechos is a small man in a black suit, with an oversized head, receding black hair and a small moustache. He is always put in as a comic relief character; his short-sightedness causes him to react in ways which causes some inconvenience to Mort and Phil if they happen to cross his path. He has his own comic series (little known outside Spain) and makes cameo appearances in Ibañez's other works.

The Minister
Vicente's boss (and the only person who he ever shows deference to). His appearance changes constantly throughout the series. In recent appearances has been replaced by a caricature of the President of the Government of Spain at the time.

Señora Superintendente
The wife of Vicente (also with an ever-changing face). She is in charge of their household.

Bestiájez 
The giant agent of the T.I.A. He usually has to hunt down Mort and Phil because they do not want to do their missions. A rather minor character, his face has changed many times in the past. Many other agents appear, most of them having descriptive surnames ending in "-ez" ("Bestiájez" comes from "bestia", beast/brute).

Tete Cohete
Tete Cohete (lit. "Tete Rocket") is a fifteen-year-old boy who is an enthusiastic amateur mechanic and inventor. He habitually tinkers with mechanical devices, turning many of them into rocket-powered (hence his name) or hazardous contraptions, and because he neglects to warn other people about his modifications, often causes a lot of grief to any adults in his vicinity.

Tete Cohete was the main protagonist for another Ibáñez comic series which ran from 1981 to 1986. He makes infrequent cameos in other Ibáñez titles, particularly Mortadelo y Filemón and El botones Sacarino.

Parody characters
There are also parodies of numerous celebrities and political personalities such as Ronald Reagan, José María Aznar or (in three albums in 2017) Donald Trump.

Albums
In order of publication:

Between 1969 and 1971

El sulfato atómico
Contra el "gang" del Chicharrón
Safari callejero
Valor y... ¡al toro!
El caso del bacalao
Chapeau el "esmirriau"
La máquina del cambiazo
La caja de los diez cerrojos
¡Magín "el mago"!
¡A la caza del cuadro!

Between 1972 and 1974

Los inventos del profesor Bacterio
Gatolandia 76
Operación: ¡Bomba!
Los diamantes de la gran duquesa
El otro "yo" del profesor Bacterio
Los monstruos
El elixir de la vida
El circo
El antídoto
Los invasores
Los cacharros majaretas
¡A las armas!
El plano de Alí-Gusa-No

Between 1975 and 1976

¡Pánico en el zoo!
Concurso-oposición
Los mercenarios
Objetivo: eliminar al Rana
Misión de perros
Los secuestradores
La gallina de los huevos de oro
El caso del calcetín

Between 1977 and 1979

El brujo
¡Soborno!
Los guardaespaldas
Mundial 78
Los gamberros
Contrabando
La máquina de copiar gente
Los "bomberos"
El transformador metabólico
¡A por el niño!
La gente de Vicente
Secuestro aéreo

Between 1980 and 1981

Olimpiada 1980
La elasticina
Kilociclos asesinos
Ladrones de coches
Lo que el viento se dejó
La brigada bichera
Tete Cohete
En marcha el mundial 82
El caso de los señores pequeñitos

Between 1982 and 1983

En Alemania
Queda inaugurado el mundial 82
El balón catastrófico
Billy "El Horrendo"
¡Hay un traidor en la T.I.A.!
El bacilón
El ascenso

Between 1984 and 1985

La estatua de la libertad
Testigo de cargo
Los Ángeles 84
El cacao espacial
El preboste de seguridad
El cochecito leré

Between 1986 and 1987

¡Terroristas!
El huerto siniestro
El estropicio metereológico
Los que volvieron de "allá"
Seúl 88

Between 1988 and 1989

La perra de las galaxias
Los sobrinetes
Los superpoderes
Las tacillas volantes
La cochinadita nuclear
Armas con bicho
La maldición gitana
El candidato
La Gomeztroika
El ansia de poder
¡...Va la T.I.A. y se pone al día!

Between 1990 and 1992

El profeta Jeremías
El premio No-Vel
El rescate botarate
El gran sarao
Los espantajomanes
El inspector general
El atasco de incluencias
La crisis del golfo
Barcelona 92
El caso del señor-probeta
La tergiversicina
Las embajadas chifladas
El racista
El quinto centenario
El S.O.E.
El 35 aniversario

Between 1993 and 1994

El señor todoquisque
Maastricht ¡...Jesús!
El nuevo "cate"
Robots bestiajos
Clínicas antibirria
Dinosaurios
La ruta del yerbajo
Mundial 94
El pinchazo telefónico
¡Pesadillaaa...!
Corrupción a mogollón

Between 1995 and 1996

¡Timazo al canto!
Animalada
20.000 leguas de viaje sibilino
¡Silencio, se rueda!
El disfraz, cosa falaz...
La prensa cardiovascular
El jurado popular
El ángel de la guarda
Atlanta 96
100 años de cómic
Expediente J
El trastomóvil

Between 1997 and 1998

¡Desastre!
Bye bye, Hong-Kong!
Esos kilitos malditos
Los verdes
Las vacas chaladas
Mundial 98
La banda de los guiris
Su vida privada
¡Deportes de espanto!
El espeluznante doctor Bíchez

Between 1999 and 2000

El óscar del moro
La maldita maquinita
El tirano
La M.I.E.R.
Impeachment!
De los ochenta p´arriba...
Siglo XX, ¡qué progreso!
Sydney 2000
La vuelta
La sirenita
Fórmula uno

Between 2001 and 2003

La rehabilitación esa
Los vikingos
¡Llegó el euro!
El ordenador... ¡qué horror!
¡Okupas!
Mundial 2002
¡Misión triunfo!
¡El estrellato!
¡Mascotas!
Parque de atracciones
El UVA (Ultraloca Velocidad Automotora)

Between 2004 and 2008

¡Rapto tremendo!
Atenas 2004
El señor de los ladrillos
Mortadelo de la Mancha
Prohibido fumar
¡El carnet al punto!
El kamikaze Regúlez
Mundial 2006
¡Bajo el bramido del trueno!
El dopaje...¡qué potaje!
Euro Basket 2007
¡...Y van 50 tacos!
¡Venganza cincuentona!
¡El dos de mayo!
Pekín 2008
Gasolina... ¡la ruina!

Between 2009 and 2017

¡En la Luna!
¡Por Isis, llegó la crisis!
Nuestro antepasado, El Mico
La gripe "U"
Mundial 2010
Marrullería en la Alcaldía
Chernobil... ¡Qué cuchitril!
¡A reciclar se ha dicho!
Jubilación... ¡a los noventa!
La bombilla... ¡chao, chiquilla!
Londres 2012
¡Espías!
El coche eléctrico
¡Brommm!
La litrona...¡vaya mona!
Mundial 2014
¡Tijeretazo!
Contra Jimmy el Cachondo
El Tesorero
¡Elecciones!
Río 2016
¡El capo se escapa!
Sueldecitos más bien bajitos
Drones Matones
¡Miseria, La Bacteria!
El 60 Aniversario

Between 2018 and 2020

Mundial 2018
Por el Olimpo ese
Urgencias del Hospital... ¡Fatal!
Da Vinci, el Pintamona... Lisa
Mundial de Baloncesto 2019
¡Felices Fiestaaas!
Tokio 2020
Misterio en el Hipermercado

Animated series

There was an animated series in 1994 titled Mortadelo y Filemón with Spanish voice actors. It also had an English dub that only released in the United Kingdom.

Film adaptations
Between 1965 and 1970, Rafael Vara directed 16 short animated films which were united in two films (Festival de Mortadelo y Filemón and Segundo festival de Mortadelo y Filemón). In 1970, he made a proper feature film, El armario del tiempo.

There are two live action films based on the comic: Mortadelo & Filemon: The Big Adventure by Javier Fesser (2003) and Mort & Phil. Mission: Save Earth by Miguel Bardem (2008).

Javier Fesser directed the 3D animated film Mortadelo and Filemon: Mission Implausible (2014).

Video game adaptation

A video game based on Mort & Phil, entitled El sulfato atómico, was developed by the Spanish company Alcachofa Soft, creator of Drascula: The Vampire Strikes Back. It sold above 40,000 units. According to its lead designer, it was developed on a small budget.

In other languages
Afrikaans: Rommel en Drommel
Arabic: شاطر و ماكر (Smart and Cunning)
Catalan: Mortadel·lo i Filemó
Chinese: 特工二人组
Czech: Clever & Smart
Danish: Flip og Flop
Dutch: Paling en Ko
French: Mortadel et Filémon (formerly also Futt et Fil)
German: Clever & Smart (formerly also Flip & Flap)
Greek: Αντιρίξ και Συμφωνίξ (Antirix kai Symfonix; Antirix "He who disagrees", Symfonix "He who agrees")
Hungarian: Mortadelo és Filemón
Italian: Mortadello e Polpetta
Japanese: モートとフィル
Norwegian: Flipp og Flopp (earliest pocket editions), Clever & Smart
Polish: Mortadelo i Filemon
Portuguese: Mortadelo e Salaminho (Brazil), Mortadela e Salamão (Portugal)
Romanian: Mortadelo și Filemon
Russian: Морт и Фил (Мортадело и Филемон) (Mort i Fil (Mortadelo i Filemon))
Slovak: Clever & Smart
Slovene: Mortadelc pa File
Swedish: Flink & Fummel
Turkish: Dörtgöz ile Dazlak
Finnish: Älli ja Tälli (earlier Nopsa ja Näpsä)
Serbo-Croatian: Zriki Švargla i Šule Globus

See also
Spanish comics
Spy vs. Spy

References

External links
 

 
1958 comics debuts
Fictional Spanish people
Comics adapted into television series
Comics adapted into video games